The Brazilian Society for Analytic Philosophy (BSAP) (also Sociedade Brasileira de Filosofia Analítica) is a philosophical society based in Brazil and founded in 1930 dedicated to promoting the study of analytic philosophy.

References

External links 
BSAP website

Philosophical societies
Analytic philosophy
Learned societies of Brazil